Peter Davison (born 15 November 1944) is a former  Australian rules footballer who played with North Melbourne in the Victorian Football League (VFL). His jumper number was 39.

Notes

External links 

Living people
1944 births
Australian rules footballers from Victoria (Australia)
North Melbourne Football Club players